Julie de Carneilhan is a 1941 novel by the French writer Colette.

Film adaptation
In 1950 it was adapted into a film of the same title directed by Jacques Manuel and starring Edwige Feuillère.

References

Bibliography
 Goble, Alan. The Complete Index to Literary Sources in Film. Walter de Gruyter, 1999.

1941 French novels
Novels by Colette
French novels adapted into films